Penstemon comarrhenus (dusty beardtongue or dusty penstemon) is a perennial plant in the plantain family (Plantaginaceae) found in the Colorado Plateau and Canyonlands region of the southwestern United States.

Description

Growth pattern

Leaves and stems

Inflorescence and fruit
It produces pale blue flowers from May to July. Fruits are small capsules.

Distribution and habitat
It can be found in pinyon juniper woodland, mountain brush, ponderosa pine forest, and Douglas fir and aspen forest communities.

Ecology
Bees are the primary pollinator.

References

comarrhenus
Flora of the Southwestern United States